The 1961–62 Ohio State Buckeyes men's basketball team represented Ohio State University. The team's head coach was Fred Taylor.

Roster

Schedule

|-
!colspan=9 style=| Non-Conference Regular season

|-
!colspan=9 style=| Big Ten Regular season

|-
!colspan=9 style=| NCAA Tournament

Rankings

Awards and honors
 John Havlicek, First Team All-Big Ten
 Jerry Lucas, All-America selection
 Jerry Lucas, Chicago Tribune Silver Basketball
 Jerry Lucas, First Team All-Big Ten
 Jerry Lucas, USBWA College Player of the Year

Team players drafted into the NBA

References

Ohio State Buckeyes men's basketball seasons
NCAA Division I men's basketball tournament Final Four seasons
Ohio State Buckeyes
Ohio State
Ohio State Buckeyes
Ohio State Buckeyes